Jan Jeuring (born 27 November 1947) is a Dutch former professional football player. He played his entire career in the Eredivisie for FC Twente.

Career
Jeuring finished second in the league with FC Twente in 1973–74 season, two points behind Feyenoord. Then, he reached the UEFA Cup final in 1974–75 but lost to Borussia Mönchengladbach. Later on, he won the KNVB Cup in 1976–77. He played 326 matches in all competitions scoring 103 goals.

Honours
FC Twente
 KNVB Cup: 1976–77; runners-up: 1974–75
 UEFA Cup runners-up: 1974–75

Individual
 UEFA Cup Top Scorer: 1972–73
 Top scorer for FC Twente in Eredivisie: 1966–67, 1970–71, 1972–73, 1975–76

References

1947 births
Living people
Dutch footballers
Netherlands international footballers
Eredivisie players
FC Twente players
Footballers from Enschede
Association football forwards